The Other Place may refer to:

 The Other Place (novel), a 1999 young adult novel
 The Other Place (play), a 2012 play by Sharr White
 The Other Place (film), a 2017 film by Lee Amir-Cohen
 "The Other Place", a short story by Margaret Atwood
 The Other Place (collection), a collection of short stories by J. B. Priestley
 The other place, a euphemism used in many bicameral parliaments using the Westminster system
 Hell seen from heaven and vice versa
 Oxford University as regarded from Cambridge University and vice versa
 The Other Place, the world of demons in The Bartimaeus Sequence
 The Other Place (theatre), was a black box theatre in Stratford-upon-Avon, England.

See also
Another place (disambiguation)
The Other Palace